Cherokee County Electric Cooperative Association is a non-profit rural electric utility cooperative headquartered in Rusk, Texas.

The Cooperative was organized in 1939.

The Cooperative serves portions of four counties in the state of Texas, in a territory generally surrounding Rusk.

Currently (as of July 2017) the Cooperative has over 3,300 miles of line and over 20,000 meters.

External links
Cherokee County Electric Cooperative Association
Deregulated Choices in Cherokee County

Companies based in Texas
Electric cooperatives in Texas
Cherokee County, Texas
Nacogdoches County, Texas
Rusk County, Texas
Smith County, Texas